is a Japanese game show that aired between 1986 and 1990 on the Tokyo Broadcasting System (TBS). It features the Japanese comedian Takeshi Kitano (also known as Beat Takeshi) as a count who owns a castle and sets up difficult physical challenges for players (or a volunteer army) to get to him. The show became a cult television hit around the world. It was highly influential on global popular culture, inspiring a genre of game shows involving physical challenges and painful entertainment, as well as other media. A special live "revival" was broadcast on 2 April 2005, for TBS's 50th anniversary celebrations.

Original Takeshi's Castle

The original show involved between 86 and 142 contestants whom General Tani (Hayato Tani) "forced" into a series of physical challenges, in some ways similar to those in It's a Knockout eliminating many of the contestants. Each episode ended with a "Cart Battle" in which the remaining contestants faced off against Count Takeshi (Kitano) and his henchmen. In early episodes, the contestants would storm the castle set itself in a short-range water gun assault. Later episodes introduced carts with paper rings, and eventually lasers and light-sensitive targets. If the contestant's gun penetrated the paper ring or hit the sensor on Takeshi's cart, against such weapons as a large water gun and a laser-armed plane, Takeshi's cart was deactivated, the castle was "taken" and the game won. During the water-gun version, if Takeshi was defeated, all surviving players split the prize between them. During the laser-gun version, the player who stopped Takeshi won 1 million yen (which, at the time, was roughly equivalent to US$8,000 or £5,000 sterling). In 2004 a website called Takeshi Mania published an injury list. The publisher admitted that he had fabricated the list in an effort to "make a little fun". In truth, there were few to no major injuries reported on the show.

The series featured extensive landscaping of a fixed campus at TBS-owned Midoriyama (Green Mountain) Studios that included large man-made lakes and extensive permanent obstacles in Yokohama, Kanagawa. The final regular episode aired on 14 April 1989, followed by 4 one-off specials up until 19 October 1990. A special revival took place just outside the TBS Building for the network's Spring All-Star Thanksgiving Festival on 2 April 2005, and featured Lake of the Dragon God and Gibraltar Straight.

Challenges
A wide range of challenges were used throughout the history of Takeshi's Castle, some occurring only once or twice, or others in virtually every show, depending upon their popularity and ease of preparation. Many challenges involve falling into water or mud on failure. Here is a list of challenges:

Barrier of the Border - A tall two-faced soaped slope that contestants had to climb. In order to help them, several ropes to attached at the top, and grabbing one of them would almost guarantee success. Once a contestant has made it over the wall, they have to slide down the other side and into a small trench of water.
Wall to Freedom Becomes Far - Ten gates with eight doors each are facing the contestants. One-two doors of which are made of paper, the rest are either blocked by wooden plates or consist of paper but have a net behind. Once the contestants have made it through the tenth wall, they have to sift through a large vat of flour in order to find a colored tennis ball, which will signify victory.
You Can't Continue on an Empty Stomach - Several buns encased in plastic bags are hanging from a rope. In order to succeed, contestants have to grab onto a bun with their mouth, whilst their arms are affixed to their sides by either an inflatable rubber ring or a large potato sack.
Boundary Roulette - First, contestants must choose a disk with different indication, ranging from numbers from 0 to 36, "Black", "Red", "Odd" or "Even", before they have to sit down on the corresponding spot on the roulette table. Then, a giant roulette wheel is spun, and the outcome of the spin determines which contestants will be eliminated.
First Fortress - Contestants must climb an extremely narrow and steep staircase holding water pistols, all the while making sure that the paper ring attached to their helmets doesn't get destroyed or soaked by the Takeshi Gundan who also have water pistols and targets of their own.
Devil's Domain - There is a maze composed of either four-sided or six-sided rooms laid out in a 4x3 rectangle (5x4 when playing with three guards). The aim is to navigate the maze while avoiding the guards and reach the goal. Some doors lead to a pool of water that contestants can fall in which also constitutes a loss.
Dragon God's Pond - In this game, contestant have to cross a lake via twenty-five (give or take) stones, some of which are affixed to the lakes floor by only a chain, which sink when stepped on. In early versions, A variation of Wall to Freedom is on the other side of the lake. Contestants must choose one of four doors, two of which are made of paper, two of which are solid. Breaking through a paper door results in win. 
Heaven and Hell - Contestants have to grab a rope, and swing across a muddy pit with the goal of landing on a platform. A later version renamed New Heaven and Hell required contestants to get some momentum by running down a pathway then swing in a semi-circle, hoping to land on a platform.  
Beach Boys and Gals - Contestants have to ride a surfboard then traverse several obstacles: Originally, contestants had to jump over several styrofoam obstacles (designed to look like axolotl) and duck under other obstacles (designed to look like a shark's mouth). Later scrapped and brought back as Spinning Beach Boys and Gals, this version was played several feet over water, with the surfboard attached to a rotating arm. The goal was to stay on the surfboard and reach the finish platform (made to look like a tropical island).
Sumo Pon - Five sumo wrestlers are shown. Then, contestants have to draw a ball from a box, and the ball's color determines which wrestler they will be up against. They then have to defeat their opponent in a Sumo Wrestling Match in order to win.
It's an Earthquake Grandpa! - Wearing grey wigs and clothing traditionally worn by Japanese Elders, contestants have to kneel onto a pile of foam blocks and keep their positions while the chamber they're in simulates a small earthquake. 
Runaway Train of Death - Contestants sit on a mat and are pushed down a sloped track into the water. Their aim is to jump onto a lillypad at the sides: a large wobbly one on the left and a smaller but more stable one on the right.
Thud Calligraphy - First, contestants must fire a crossbow onto a small wheel, determining what Japanese character they need to draw. Then, they must grab an oversized brush and have 30 seconds to draw the character on the designated area of a wet slope.
Adventure Zone - Contestants have to overcome an obstacle course akin to a video game, all the while a robot atop the background structure moves along. Reaching the end of the course ends in a win unless the aforementioned robot has reached the finish first. Should this happen, the contestant is then disqualified and usually thrown into water by a guard.
The Longest Yard - Contestants must carry a football across the playing field while defenders wearing large foam football player costumes try to prevent them from doing so. Getting pinned on the ground by the defenders means a loss.
Mr. Daruma is Falling Down - Based on a well known Japanese children game and while wearing oversized daruma costumes, contestants must climb up a hill. Atop the hill is a guard, facing away from the contestants, chanting "だるまさんがころんだ" (Daruma-san has fallen down). After he's finished he turns around. If he sees anyone moving, they are disqualified. If they fall down the hill, they are also disqualified. Making it to the top of the hill signifies victory.
Flat Chest - Wearing a white bodysuit with velcro on the front, contestants must swing themselves over a lake then stick onto a Velcro wall in front of them.
Roller Game - Contestants must cross a large pond by running over seven rolling pins placed at uneven heights. These pins can rotate on an axis making it difficult for contestants to keep them stationary.
You Can't Save the Ball - First, contestants must knock a ball into a giant pachinko machine, then grab a bowl, run down a staircase then wait on a narrow ledge for the ball to come down so that they can jump in a pit of mud to catch it in their bowl.
Study the Cards Game - Wearing oversized hand costumes, five contestants compete against five of Takeshi's Gundan. As the start of each round, Michiru Jo will recite a mathematical problem or a question with a numerical answer, and once he is done doing so, contestants must find the correct answer then fall onto it.
You Too are Masaru Uno-Kid - Wearing oversized baseball player costumes, contestants must catch a baseball that either Pop or Corn bats in the air. This game is played multiple times with the same group.
Aquatic Volleyball - Taking place on a mat floating on water, contestants must play a game of volleyball and score three points first. There are three possible opponents: Takeshi's guards, a female volleyball team or women in swimwear.
Straight of Gibraltar - Taking place on an unstable and wobbly bridge, contestants must first catch and hold onto a golden ball shot to them by General Tani then make their way across the bridge, all the while Takeshi's Gundan fire cannonballs at them.
Gah! I Don't Know! - Contestants sit on a circular disc on a rolling track. They are pushed down and shown several signs forming a mathematical problem. Once at the end of the track, they need to solve and say the result of the problem out loud. Answering incorrectly or failing to give an answer will make the end of the track collapse, causing the contestant to fall into a tub of flour, or in later versions, mud.
Star Bowling - Contestants must pick one of 10 playing cards (numbered one through ten). This determines their position. Contestants are then placed into oversized bowling pin costumes with their ankles taped together. A large foam Bowling Ball is then rolled at them. If a contestant remains standing, they win. If they fall over, they lose.
Pulling Hell - Contestants choose one of five colored ropes, the ends of which are obstructed by a large wall. Contestants then engage in a tug of war game with whoever or whatever is holding the opposite side of the rope they chose. 
Ball Run - Contestants must climb up a stepp slope, all the while Takeshi's guards roll down differently sized boulders at them. They can use several gaps in the walls to avoid them, but once they used a gap, it closes.
Stab and Be Stabbed - In a challenge modeled after the popular children's game Pop Up Pirate, contestants sit on a giant barrel, then must choose one of six slots, with Michiru Jo sliding a sword inside. Choosing one of the two trapped slots will cause the barrel's top to tip over, which in turn makes the contestant slide down a slope into a pond. The goal is to pick 3 slots correctly (4 in its first every playing)
Ladder Lottery of Difficult Times - Contestants must choose one of five doors, then follow the path until they come across a junction, akin to a ladder lottery. Once they reach the end of the path, they need to climb up a set of stairs and slide down the slide. If they've chosen the correct slide, they will slide into safety. An incorrect slide will drop them in the mud. 
Combinations of Love - Played in pairs, contestants must choose either even or odd. Then, wearing oversized dice costumes, they are rolled down a slope one at a time, and the sum of the two dice rolls must correspond whichever option the couple chose at the beginning.
You Jumped, Congratulations! - Contestants start on a high up platform and need to pole vault over a pond in order to land onto a small platform.
Dash Over the Mud, Youth - Simulating a baseball game, the pitcher throws a ball that the batter purposefully misses. Once the catcher caught the ball, contestants must run from first to the second base and traverse a large strand of mud before being tagged out.
Rush Out, Youth! - Contestants wait behind saloon doors in front of a pit of mud. On the General's whistle, Michiru Jo will shoot a soccer ball in the air, and the contestants need to traverse the mud pit to catch the ball.
Man Eating Holes - The penultimate challenge for most of the series run. The contestants must jump into one of five large holes in the ground. Two of which are being guarded by either Makoto Dainenji or Katsuo Tokashiki and the last three leading to Takeshi's castle. Usually, Dainenji and Tokashiki are dressed in costumes and perform a skit prior to the game's start.

Music
Takeshi's Castle challenges used a wide variety of well-known songs from movies, television shows, video games, anime, and other sources.

Characters

Count "Beat" Takeshi (ビートたけし; Kitano, born 18 January 1947) — The lord of his castle and eventual target of the competition. He also made commentary on the contestants.
Takeshi Doll — During a prolonged period when Takeshi was forbidden to appear on television (his punishment for an act of violence against reporters and photogs from a scandal magazine), one of the Emerald Guards filled in by wearing his robe and a giant papier-mâché Takeshi head, similar to ones worn by sports team mascots.
Saburo Ishikura (石倉三郎, born 16 December 1946) — First advisor of the Takeshi's castle. Discussed the competition with Takeshi and provided comedy skits as well.
Sonomanma Higashi (real name Hideo Higashikokubaru, born 16 September 1957) — Originally leader of the Emerald Guards. He replaced Ishikura as the advisor of the Takeshi's castle in the middle of the series run.
Takeshi's Gundan (Defense Troops) (たけし軍団) — The Count's guards who wore white or green, seen in "Final Showdown" and other challenges, and are more popularly known as "The Emerald Guards". When Higashi became Takeshi's new advisor, Omori Utaemon took over as the leader. Other members included Matsuo Bannai, Tsumami Edamame, Yurei Yanagi, Rakkyo Ide, Great Gidayu, Dankan, Third Nagasima, "Rusher" Itamae, Taka Gadarukanaru, Hakase Suidobashi, Sintaru Mizushima and "Loyal" Tadajij Kikuchi. Rakkyo Ide was the bald guy in the "Monsters Special" who wore a shark outfit and suffered some serious bleeding when he fell in during Skipping Stones. These troops were also usually seen in the background behind Takeshi and his advisor during the show.
General Tani (Hayato Tani) (谷隼人, born 9 September 1946) — Known in the UK and Indian version as General Lee. Led the contestants through the challenges set by Count Takeshi. His real-life wife, Kikko Matsuoka (born 11 February 1947), appeared in an episode resulting in a comedic conflict between the couple.
Tani's Assistant – On international specials (involving non-Japanese players), General Tani was assisted by a so-far-unnamed lady who served as his translator. Chuck Wilson also acted as his assistant in two international specials.
Junji Inagawa (also known as Jyunji Inagawa) (稲川淳二, born 9 September 1946), Akira Sakamoto (born 31 July 1949) and Shingo Yanagisawa (柳沢慎吾, born 6 March 1962) — Three of the Battlefield Reporters, however there were many more. They usually wore safari outfits.
Kibaji Tankobo (丹古母鬼馬二, born 4 January 1950) and Shozo "Strong" Kobayashi (ストロング金剛, 25 December 1940 — 31 December 2021) — Two physically imposing guards most famous for featuring in the Honeycomb Maze challenge. Kibaji usually wore a long red wig, while Strong was bald, and they painted their faces to further intimidate contestants. In addition to frightening and chasing the contestants in the Honeycomb Maze, Tankobo and Kobayashi also smeared black, sticky paint all over the contestants that they caught in the maze. Tankobo and Kobayashi were considered to be two of the finest henchmen Takeshi had.
Brad Lesley, aka "Animal" (亜仁丸レスリー, 11 September 1958 – 27 April 2013) — American baseball player. His main job was to humiliate and frighten the contestants in any possible way, usually dressed as a samurai complete with a sword. Animal has also been seen in a green sumo suit, spider costume, Fred Flintstone–style outfit, a baseball uniform and a Las Vegas–era Elvis Presley jumpsuit costume.
Michiru Jo (城みちる, born 18 November 1957) — One of the few guards to have been involved from the very first episode and be involved until the show finished, he normally wore a distinctive pink outfit. Jo was a Japanese pop singer in the 1970s.
Yoroi/Ritter Chuu — He was a sixteen-foot tall samurai who tried to keep players from reaching the goals in several games. Known in the UK as the Boxing Monster because of the size of his hands.
Makoto Dainenji (大念寺誠) and Katsuo Tokashiki (渡嘉敷勝男, born 27 July 1960) — Makoto, a karate master, and Katsuo, a boxing champion in Japan, were the Final Fall guards, usually wearing outrageous costumes. Katsuo also served as the referee in the Sumo Rings game.
Masanori Okada (岡田正典, born 19 October 1953) — Usually seen in the game "Slip Way", he would jump out of the water to push the contestants into the drink if they failed to reach the target. Okada has also played in the Honeycomb Maze and other games as well. Also known as the "Sea Goblin" in Japan and was a boxer in the 1970s.
Umanosuke Ueda, (上田馬之助, 20 June 1940 – 21 December 2011) — This aggressive guard, a former wrestler in real life, has appeared in Honeycomb Maze, Square Maze, Sumo Rings, Grid Iron and Bridge Ball.
Youshichi Shimada (島田洋七, born 10 February 1950) — A guard that was usually seen in the games Blueberry Hill in overalls akin to those worn by Dennis the Menace, and in Wipe Out dressed up as a female Native American nicknamed "Pocahontas" who would push contestants into the water if they missed the surfboard.
Shoji Kinoshita and Shoichi Kinoshita — Better known as "Popcorn" (ポップコーン, born 1 January 1959), these well-known identical twin actors in Japan were commonly seen wearing rainbow ponchos and bowler hats. They have also worn baseball uniforms and other humorous costumes, appearing in the game Rice Bowl Down Hill where they would try and put the contestants off by singing a very annoying chant, 'unda unda unda' as well as Bridge Ball and other games. Due to their attire, they were also known as the Rainbow Warriors.
Shinoburyo (忍竜) — Sumo wrestler in Japan who appeared in the game Sumo Rings during the series. Known as Porker in the UK edition.
Large Fuji (born 26 August 1958 – 14 October 2012) — Replaced Shinoburyo in the later episodes as the purple sumo fighter in Sumo Rings.
Konishiki Doll — Only seen in Sumo Rings and on an odd occasion of Tug of War. The Konishiki Doll was one of the Defence Troops dressed in a large costume which is meant to resemble Konishiki Yasokichi, one of the largest sumo wrestlers to ever live. Known as "Spud" in the British version.
Noboru "Shin" Suganuma (すがぬま伸, born 5 July 1952) — Loyal member of Takeshi's Gundan, who wore red and who was a pathetic sumo wrestler in Sumo Rings. 
Ritsuko Nakayama (中山 律子, born 12 October 1942) — Also known as Refreshing Ritsuko-Ritsuko, she is a professional bowler in Japan who has appeared in the Star Bowling game.
Yutaka Enatsu — A real-life Japanese baseball player, he made a guest appearance as the pie thrower in Die or Pie in a single episode.
"Ordinary" Oki Bondo (大木凡人, born 1 July 1949) — The emcee of the karaoke bar in the Karaoke game.
Koji Sekiyama (関山耕司 born 22 May 1929) — Karaoke bar owner who decided whether contestants singing was good enough to progress through to the next round. Later replaced by Nobuo Yana.
Nobuo Yana (born 13 August 1935) — Replaced Koji Sekiyama as the karaoke bar owner later in the series and decided whether a contestant had sung well enough to progress through to the next round.
Takayuki Yokomizo (born 2 August 1963) — Bouncer in the karaoke bar who violently withdrew contestants from the building if Sekiyama (later Yana) decided that their singing wasn't good enough.
Geisha Girls or Bunny Girls — Led by Miyuki Ono, they helped contestants in several games and also helped Takeshi and his advisor in comedy skits. Other known girls included Harumi Tomikawa, Mika, Mina Morishima, Sawada, and Mitsumi Yokota. Sometimes, when Junji and Shingo were off the show for other commitments, one of them served in the Battlefield Reporter's role.
Shizuo Miyauchi (宮内鎮雄, born 24 January 1945) — Commentator for the original series in Japan. Retired from TBS in 2005 after working as a commentator for several decades.
Ultraman – Has appeared in the show on many occasions, among other occasions the first was to help the kids through a number of the challenges in the "Kids Only" special, the second was as a replacement for General Tani (For unknown reasons). The third occasion was in the monster's special, along with other members of the "Ultra Brothers". (Due to a licensing dispute, "The Monster Special" episode of MXC was heavily edited upon its release on DVD, with all Ultraman characters removed.)

Character counterparts

International versions

Arab countries
In Arab countries the show was called Al Hisn. It originally aired in the mid to late 1980s where it became a cult hit. The show was syndicated to multiple TV stations across different countries, which was a common practice at the time for localized foreign programs. Various public stations may re-run the show on non-specific occasions. Other than the voice-over commentary and the opening/closing themes, the episodes were largely retained as originally aired in Japan. The commentary was provided by Lebanese television personality Riad Sharara, then later by Jamal Rayyan, who is currently a well-known news broadcaster in Al Jazeera's Arabic TV news channel. The Arabic version was produced and distributed by Amman-based company Middle East Art Production and Distribution.

In 2017 the Saudi Arabian Sports Authority Signed a contract with TBS To build a Saudi-inspired Takeshi's castle in Riyadh, the first episode of which aired on 25 September 2019 on MBC 1.

Australia
An edit of the show was produced by The Comedy Channel, it had hosts in the local studio and was redubbed. This has since been cancelled and/or finished. The show was hosted by two housemates from series two of Australian Big Brother Shannon Cleary and Nathan Morris. It also featured a crossdressing Geisha girl named Beryl. Some episodes featured a special guest third host, including Greg Fleet. Highlights appeared in Australia on the television program World's Weirdest TV. The American version MXC currently airs on Fox8 (an Australian cable network). The Australian writer and critic Clive James was once a celebrity contestant on the original show.

Brazil
During the 1990s, a version was aired by Rede Globo, called Olimpíadas do Faustão (Portuguese for "Faustão's Olympics"), as an insert in Fausto Silva's Sunday-afternoon variety show Domingão do Faustão. In 1994, rival SBT copied that version, and a legal action by Globo and SBT stopped the broadcasting. On 1 June 2008, SBT Keshi remake reappeared on TV, now licensed, remaking Faustão's known games (as Bridge Ball and The Run Way), not-seen in Globo games (as Skittles and Ride the Wave), and original games (cross a balance beam after spin, or cross a small bridge using a crank-kart). The games are a segment named "Gincana" {field day} in the Programa Silvio Santos.

Czech Republic
It was shown by the name Takešiho hrad (Czech), with comedic voice-over by two Czech comedians. The commentary was mostly fictional. The show was popular among young viewers. The Czech TV channel also broadcast the show to Slovak Republic where it gained some popularity as well. In 2011 was Takešiho hrad broadcast on channel Prima Cool with a new single-voice commentary.

Denmark
The Danish TV station TV 2 Zulu bought the rights to air the Challenge version in Denmark, thus making the Danish broadcast identical to that in Britain.

Finland
On 7 January 2008, the television channel Jim started airing the UK version of the program. The comments are subtitled in Finnish. The show is titled Hullut japanilaiset (The crazy Japanese)

France
A shortened version given a comedic voiceover by comedians Vincent Desagnat and Benjamin Morgaine has been shown on the W9 TV channel since October 2006, in a program called Menu W9 (which also presented a shortened version of Sushi TV on its first season, now replaced by Sasuke). It has been also broadcast on the channel M6 which shown 2 episodes per day at 6.50 p.m from Tuesday to Friday. The voices were those of the late sport presenter Thierry Roland and Moon Dailly.

Germany
A dubbed version of the show aired on DSF in 1999. This version was released on a DVD box set with 12 selected episodes. Two more volumes were planned but were presumably canceled. A German dubbed version of the 2002 UK edit airs from 3 July 2007, on RTL II. There also exists an adaptation called Entern oder Kentern (engl.: Board or Capsize) with almost the same games but pirates as antagonists and celebrities as Team Captains. This version was aired on RTL in summer 2007. Shorter versions of episodes with comical commentary air on Comedy Central.

Greece
A version aired from 2005 to 2009 on Skai TV by the name Το κάστρο του Τακέσι (Takeshi's Castle). It has been dubbed by Kostas Papageorgiou and Akindynos Gkikas.

India
A shortened version of the show is aired on the Pogo TV channel from 1 March 2005 with Hindi dubbing by Javed Jaffrey. The show was also experimentally voiced by Indian comedians Raju Srivastav, Sunil Pal, Navin Prabhakar and Ahsaan Qureshi for a short duration.

Indonesia
The original Japanese show was being re-broadcast (with Indonesian dubs) on TPI channel from 2002 to 2006 and GTV in 2013 and 2014. In 2017, MNCTV acquired the license to remake the show which was later known as Takeshi's Castle Indonesia (a.k.a. Benteng Takeshi Indonesia) with a grand prize of Rp 100.000.000,-. After two successful seasons, the show was originally planned to enter its third season in 2018; however, due to a drug case involving Reza Bukan (the cast of King Takeshi at that time) the launch of the third season was delayed until mid-2019.

The main cast of Takeshi's Castle Indonesia includes Fero Walandouw (as the Captain), Nabila Putri, Poppy Sovia, and Desy JKT48 (as Vice-Captains in Season 1, 2, and 3 respectively), Lee Jong Hoon (as the Reporter), and Reza Bukan and Kenta (as King Takeshi in season 1–2 and 3 respectively).

In early 2022 Comedy Central's Hungarian counterpart started to broadcast the Indonesian show, redubbed with stand-up comedians Péter Elek and Péter Janklovics who tend to know nothing about the aim of the game, thus strengthen the funny circumstances of the show just like in the Czech version. However, after the premiere, repeats are aired in CET nighttime only.

Iran
It was aired by the name Masir-e Talaa'ee (when translated it means "Golden Path"), on Iran's Channel 3 in 2009 and 2010. It was hosted by Morteza and Mostafa Hosseini, the brothers of the refugee host Mohammad Hosseini.

Italy
Renamed Mai dire Banzai (Never Say: Banzai!) it first aired in 1989 on Italia 1. A reedited version interspersed with clips of another Japanese gameshow called Za Gaman, it was given a comedic voiceover by Gialappa's Band, who changed Kitano's and Saburo Ishikura's names to Gennaro Olivieri and Guido Pancaldi, historically Swiss Italian judges in Games Without Frontiers. They also renamed in absurdist comical ways the other figures of the show like calling the in-game reporter 'Pokoto Pokoto', the martially-attire'd host 'General Putzersthoefen' and so on. Gialappa's Band making fun of the duty-bound, stoic stereotype of Japan, described the games and tasks as traditional Japanese past-times and thus rather mundane and humdrum by Japanese standards, introducing a veil of non-sequitur to the show which is lacking in English language versions.

The show gained new popularity in the 2000s, when it started being broadcast on various satellite and terrestrial channels with the original title and using the half-hour episodes of the UK shortened version, with independent voiceover (superimposed to the still audible Japanese tack) done by various Italian comedians. As of 2008, this version is broadcast on GXT with the voiceover done by Trio Medusa (previously the show was commentated on by Marco Marzocca with Stefano Sarcinelli and still before by duo Lillo & Greg); shortly after it was re-aired by local broadcasters and by K2. From 10 January 2011, the series is re-transmitted in Italy on Cartoon Network and the voiceover is done by Roberto Stocchi and Francesca Draghetti.

Lithuania
The show was aired by the name Takeši pilis, featuring Fumito Tomoi (a Japanese person living in Lithuania at the time), who dubbed the show in a comic way with his broken Lithuanian. The show was very popular.

Malaysia
The Japanese version was aired over NTV7 in early 2000s, although edited to be shortened to half an hour. The broadcast was added with Malay overdub commentary (the original Japanese audio track is still audible in background). Sometimes in earlier versions, the parts that were not overdubbed are subtitled in Malay. The show was known as Istana Takeshi in Malaysia.

As of June 2010, the show is airing again using the American version with Malay subtitles on TV9 but still called Istana Takeshi instead of MXC.

Mexico
The Japanese version on Azteca 13 of TV Azteca in 1993 and Azteca 7 of TV Azteca was aired in Mexico, which, like the Spanish, has its own stories and invented by giving voices teams.

Due to the success of the American edits of Banzuke and Ninja Warrior/Sasuke on Azteca 7, on 4 May 2015, the program was broadcast by Canal 5 of Televisa, under the name Castillo Takeshi and narrated by two presenters from Televisa using the British edit as basis for their own edit. Possibly due to the upscaling from PAL to HD, it had a poor quality image, making it look even older than it was. It took the time slot where ABC's Wipeout had been broadcast since 2014. After just three weeks, the show was replaced by ABC's Wipeout, which has had a longer more successful run on Mexican TV.

Netherlands
The British cut of the show aired on 15 August 2009, on Comedy Central, with Dutch voice-over provided by sports commentator Ronald van Dam and actor/comedian Ruben van der Meer.

Takeshi's Castle Thailand in its UK format commenced airing on 22 March 2018, with commentary by actress/singer Katja Schuurman and vocalist Pepijn Lanen.

Philippines
It was first shown on the Intercontinental Broadcasting Corporation TV network in 1989 as a Filipino-dubbed show. Later episodes contained interludes shot on a studio with actors Anjo Yllana as Takesh and Smokey Manoloto as "Iwakura" providing the commentary with a gravelly Japanese accent, which was later dropped in favor of their natural voices. The Filipino production crew also developed on their relationship, with Iwakura often trying to trick Takeshi on several occasions. One episode which resulted in the contestants' victory was even written as Takeshi's worst nightmare; when Iwakura finally wakes him up, Takeshi is so traumatized that he asks to call off a scheduled taping. Makers of the malt drink brand Ovaltine created an in-show mini contest as part of a product endorsement deal in 1991. In this version, the names given to most of the challenges are translated from their original Japanese such as "Devil's Maze" for the Honeycomb and Square Mazes, "Flying Mushroom" for Mushroom Trip, and "Sumo Wrestling" for Sumo Rings.

The IBC episodes of Takeshi's Castle were later rerun on SBN during 1993 and 1994. The show was not edited as before at IBC.

Takeshi's Castle enjoyed a revival in the Philippines in 2006. This time around, comedians Joey de Leon and Ryan Yllana (Anjo's younger brother) provide the commentary as fictional characters shogun Shintaro "Taru" Gokoyami who is Takeshi's right-hand man and sumo wrestler Kakawate Takehome, the leader of the Takeshi Gundan, fictional in the sense that there are no such characters in the original cast. Initially, the two provide play-by-play commentary, but they as well as some added characters reduced themselves to skits and commentary in between clips of the show. Later, as part of Q's first anniversary, Anjo finally appeared alongside the new cast, reprising his role as "prince" Takeshi.

Due to Takeshi's Castle's competitive ratings, the management of GMA Network (which produces shows for its sister network Q) decided to move the show from its original station in an evening slot, now to the early afternoon weekend slot of GMA. Takeshi's Castle is aired on a weekly basis as opposed to the weekdays airing on Q, and is aired before Eat Bulaga on Saturdays and before SOP on Sundays. This is done to increase and improve the ratings of the succeeding shows. Takeshi's Castle started to air on GMA on 23 December 2006, with same hosts. The show aired on its last episode on 9 May 2007, and after a long break of TV experience, Joey and Ryan assumed new personalities as Master GT (later Tirso Potter) and Captain B respectively. It was temporarily replaced by Just Joking which starred also Joey De Leon and Ryan Yllana and other casts. On 15 August 2007, "Takeshi's Castle" returned on air once again with all new episodes and Mike "Pekto" Nacua (Cookie), John Feir (Belli) and Love Añover (replacement when either Cookie or Belli was not in) become commentators. The show aired at Saturdays 11:30 a.m. before Eat Bulaga!, and Sundays 11:15 a.m. before SOP Rules.

On GMA's regional networks, a Cebuano-dubbed show now on GMA Cebu & Davao from Saturdays and Sundays in the morning by Cebuano version from title called Takeshi's Castle Wala Gyud sa Isaysay Banzai! (Never Say Banzai!).

Portugal
A version called Nunca Digas Banzai (Portuguese for "Never Say Banzai", based on the Italian name for it, Mai Dire Banzai) aired on SIC starting in 1994, where it reached some popularity. Voiceovers were provided by two hosts, José Carlos Malato and João Carlos Vaz. Takeshi and Ishikura were renamed "Fujimoto" and "Fujicarro" (a play on the Portuguese words for "[motor]bike" and "car" using the Japanese word Fuji), and the Portuguese hosts made no attempt to interpret the reality of the show, instead using the contestants as surrogates for the satirical comments about Portuguese public figures, in a similar style to MXC.

Russia
The series were featured in Ren TV project show The Best Shows of the World (Лучшие шоу мира) in the early 2000s and due to positive public reaction were aired on the regular basis on its own, named Takeshi Kitano's Castle (Замок Такеши Китано). Show was translated and aired on 2x2 channel as "Japanese amusements" (Японские забавы) during 2011–2012 and again in 2013 and 2014. The format of the show is the translated commentary version of UK adaptation.

Secondly, in 2020 – show Gold of Gelendzhik (Золото Геленджика) aired on ТНТ channel, based on Takeshi Kitano's Castle format. The action of this show takes place in the resort town of Gelendzhik in the Krasnodar Territory on the Black Sea coast. The rules of the game and challenges are similar to the original Japanese show, but with some changes, in particular, the final challenge was borrowed from another Japanese show in which participants need to climb slippery stairs and take prize.

Serbia
Show started with showing on FOX TV in January 2010 named Takeši.

Singapore
The show debuted in the early-1990s on Singapore's free-to-air channel, Channel 8, as 100 Wars, as the program was acquired from Taiwan. In the mid-1990s until early the 2000s, re-runs of the show aired on Saturdays at 1:30 pm, following the News on Channel 8.

Slovakia
During 2011 and 2012, it was Takešiho hrad broadcast on channel Joj Plus with a single-voice Slovak commentary.

South Africa
The show was broadcast daily on the Sony MAX channel, Channel 128 on DStv. It was the condensed version of the original series with commentary provided by Craig Charles. It began broadcasting in 2009 and was a huge hit with viewers. Due to its popularity the show has been aired to a broader audience on SABC 2.

Spain
The program aired in the 1990s as Humor Amarillo (when translated it means "Yellow Humour" or "Yellow Comedy") on TV channel Telecinco. Comedians Juan Herrera and Miguel Ángel Coll (son of José Luis Coll) commented on the images; this version of the show has achieved cult status and there are some fansites and web petitions for returns. In fact, the Spanish version created some terms now familiar to either Takeshi's Castle or Humor Amarillo, like "El Laberinto del Chinotauro" (literally The Chinesetaur Labyrinth, name for any of the maze challenges), "Los cañones de Nakasone" (parody of "Guns of Navarone" Spanish title), "Las Zamburguesas" (for Skipping Stones),"Gacela Thompson" ("Thompson Gazelle"), a pathetic businessman character, and "Chino Cudeiro" (The Chinese Cudeiro, as the name started to be assigned when appeared a player with a red T-shirt with the inscription "Cudeiro, Galicia, España"), the name assigned to a random player that always "dies", one of the most popular characters in Spain.

On 28 January 2006, a second version dubbed by Fernando Costilla and Paco Bravo premiered on Spanish TV channel Cuatro. They have shown every one of the original Japanese episodes, with the last one being shown on 9 June 2007, ending with a special message by the Spanish commentators. The 2006 version is currently being rebroadcast on the Telecinco-owned channel Energy.

These two versions had in common that it was naturally assumed that the dubbing was completely unrelated to the original dialogues, to the point that sometimes the references to the actual contest were really few. The commentators could turn the contestants into mushroom seekers, or people looking for a new apartment. Alongside the spectacular hits suffered by the contestants and the show's peculiar aesthetic, this helped boost its popularity.

Taiwan
A version called 100 Wars, 100 Victories on CTS and was based on the original series. It featured four teams competing for small prizes in games.

Thailand
Takeshi's Castle was dubbed and shown on Channel 5 between 1988 and 1995. The title was changed to Hod, Mun, Ha (โหด มัน ฮา), or "Cruel, Thrilling, Fun".

In 2007, the unedited original series with bilingual soundtrack (Thai & Japanese) was aired on X-ZYTE channel on TrueVisions cable TV every Sunday and rerun several times throughout a week.

In 2014, Channel 7 (Thailand) bought the rights to remake the show. "โหด มัน ฮา Takeshi's Castle Thailand" first aired on 20 July, with a new episode airing most Sundays. The show's format is identical to the one used in the original show, but with a few minor changes. Shogun Takeshi (Note Chernyim) has kept Princess Woosenko (Woonsen Virithipa Pakdeeprasong) as a prisoner in his castle. General Shahkrit (Shahkrit Yamnarm) attempts to rescue the princess from the castle by sending his army of contestants through Shogun's challenges (remade challenges include Slippery Wall, Avalanche, Honeycomb Maze, Skipping Stones, Slip Way, Sumo Rings, Wet Paint, and Tug Of War), and the last remaining contestants battle against Shogun's guards in the Showdown. Any winners receive the 1,000,000 Thai-baht cash prize, the cash prize is rolled over to the next episode if there are no winners

Later on, the show reduced the number of competitors to 20, and then 12 in current shows. With the rules format changing, the competitors don't get eliminated throughout the show, but instead work as a team. The competitors are given, by Shogun Takeshi, 10 carts and the Shogun has no guard carts at the beginning of the episode. The competitors then play 5 challenges before the Showdown. In the first challenge, usually involved all the competitors playing at the same time, every single competitors must pass the challenge, while the subsequent challenges needs at most 5 passes to be credited as a win. Winning a challenge will cause the situation remaining unchanged, while losing the first challenge takes one cart away from the competitors team and one cart added to Shogun's team in Showdown. In subsequent challenges, one car is taken away and added to Shogun's team if less than 5 competitors passed, two cars are taken if less than 3 competitors passed. In current shows, with 12 competitors, two cars are taken away if less than 3 competitors passed, while 3 passes are credit with a win, and no cars are taken away. Losing a challenge also results in a punishment for the competitors in various ways, usually messy and painful. In Showdown, the team sends out two competitors per one cart they have to battle with Shogun's guards. Succeeding in Battle awards all competitors a share of 5,000,000 baht cash prize, but the prize is remain the same in all episodes.

The show is broadcast in France on the Comedy Central TV channel and commented by Marie Palot and Louis San

Ukraine
Show was commented over and aired on QTV channel as Laughter with Takeshi Kitano (Реготня з Такеші Кітано) during 2008–2010.

United Kingdom

History
The show was first introduced to British audiences in the late 1980s, when it was featured semi-regularly as part of LWT's Tarrant on TV, in which broadcaster Chris Tarrant showcased a variety of unusual television programmes from around the world. One of the series' previous hosts, Clive James, appeared in an original Japanese episode as an international contestant – with behind the scenes footage shown as part of his two-part ITV documentary ...in Japan in 1987.

Original Challenge version
Takeshi's Castle would become more well-known later when a condensed version of the original series proved an unexpected hit when it premiered on Challenge on 9 November 2002, regularly dominating the top ten programmes on the channel each week.

Format
The UK format did not follow the original Japanese format – instead presenting each sequence of games as comic martial challenges leading to the final game wherein contestants not so far eliminated try to storm Takeshi's Castle. Each episode in the original run was narrated by Craig Charles, who also coined the term "Keshi Heads" to describe avid fans of the show. A typical episode of the UK format of Takeshi's Castle has about eight games, followed by the final Showdown. After each event, a 'Ridiculous Replay' is shown, highlighting the most entertaining attempt. Challenge decided to edit out the comedy sketches between Takeshi and Higashi to allow more (or fewer) games to be shown during the half-hour block.

Broadcast
More series were commissioned and shown over the next few months, culminating in a series of hour-long specials in the Autumn of 2003, and a special highlights show, The A-Z of Takeshi's Castle, broadcast on 1 January 2004, which showed some of the best clips of the best games as the last original series finale. On 3 September 2005, MXC aired for the first time in the UK on Challenge.

On 9 May 2007, The Paul O'Grady Show had their own mini Takeshi's Castle challenge, including 'Knock Knock', 'Bite the Bun', a "Bridge Ball" adaptation called 'Balancing Act' and the 'Slippery Wall'. The UK TV series returned to Challenge after a hiatus on 7 September 2009 with a modified opening sequence (to fit with Flextech rebranding to Virgin Media Television).

Takeshi's Castle Rebooted
In February 2010, a campaign was launched by fansite Keshi Heads in an attempt to bring a brand new series of Takeshi's Castle to Challenge within its tenth anniversary year on the channel (November 2012–13). It was suggested by campaigners that these new episodes would feature never-before-seen games (previously completely cut from other episodes), and feature five Japanese episodes new to the UK, including the Pilot and an International Special which have never been seen on TV since their original airings in Japan.

On 13 December 2012, Challenge announced that they had signed a deal for "unseen bits of Takeshi's Castle". The new series, named Takeshi's Castle Rebooted, which aired from 8 to 29 March 2013, featured games and episodes suggested by the Keshi Heads website in their campaign. Despite Craig Charles agreeing to return for the new series, Challenge brought in Richard McCourt and Dominic Wood (Dick and Dom) as the new voiceovers. Hayato Tani also filmed presentation links for the new series.

Rebooted disappointed fans, with many complaining about Charles' replacement as voiceover. Challenge reportedly received more negative comments about Rebooted, on their social media accounts, than any other show in the channel's history, with the series never once reaching its weekly top ten ratings. The original episodes returned to Challenge after Rebooted ended its run. In contrast to the newly produced series, these entered the weekly top ten rating shows almost instantly upon their return. Rebooted has since been repeated in off-peak timeslots.

Comedy Central revival
A new series of Takeshi's Castle aired on Comedy Central, with Jonathan Ross as voiceover. This version used footage from the Thailand series, and later the Indonesian version. The first series aired from 26 October to 28 December 2017, series 2 aired from 1 February to 29 March 2018, series 3 aired from 6 June to 4 July 2018, series 4 aired from 11 July to 8 August 2018, the first half of series 5 aired from 22 November to 20 December 2018, the second half of series 5 aired from 10 to 14 June 2019, series 6 aired from 20 June to 22 August 2019, series 7 aired from 15 November to 13 December 2019 and series 8 aired from 8 to 12 June 2020.

United States

In the United States, Takeshi's Castle was utilized as the video footage for the show MXC (subtitled Most Extreme Elimination Challenge) on Spike TV, which substituted the original audio with comical dubbing and commentary in English which is completely unrelated to the original dialogue and story of Takeshi's Castle. The show has also been broadcast in Canada, Australia, and New Zealand. The Thailand and Indonesian versions of the show, using the Comedy Central UK dub, aired in the US on G4, starting in late 2021.

Two attempts were made to Americanize the format:

On 28 July 1990, FOX aired a special half-hour version of the original show premise entitled King of the Mountain which was packaged by Fox Square Productions and was hosted by John Mulrooney and Judy Toll. This version used the same games, but had only 10 competitors and no costumed characters to impede the players' progress. This American attempt only taped two pilots (one on 24 July 1988), and only the aforementioned was aired. Footage from both of these pilots were used in episode 106 of Takeshi's Castle.
On 16 June 1993, CBS aired the second attempt, entitled Storm the Castle. This hour-long version, which was packaged by Vin Di Bona Productions and hosted by Michael Burger and Nely Galán, pitted 30 families against each other and against well-known monsters (such as Beetlejuice) in a quest to win $15,000. Unlike Mountain, Storm had some exclusive games not seen anywhere else. Storm, like Mountain, only lasted a single special. Future NFL player Christian Fauria appeared with his family as contestants.

Vietnam
The Vietnamese show Đại Náo Thành Takeshi produced under license, with the first episode airing 25 March 2017 in prime time on VTV3. The program features famous Vietnamese artists, with warlords Takeshi played by Trấn Thành and Sharkito by Trương Thế Vinh, and Princess Woonsenko played by Diễm My 9X. Challenges in the first episode included Slippery Wall, Slip Way, Honeycomb Maze, and Final Fall. The Show Down in front of the castle takes place in boats equipped with water spray nozzle weapons and paper disc targets.

Cultural impact
Takeshi's Castle was highly influential on popular culture around the world, inspiring a genre of game shows involving physical challenges and painful entertainment. The physical challenge game show format of Takeshi's Castle has inspired numerous game shows internationally, with popular examples including Sasuke (Ninja Warrior), American Ninja Warrior, Ninja Warrior UK, Wipeout, Total Wipeout, Hole in the Wall, and Ultimate Beastmaster. The reality television franchise I'm a Celebrity...Get Me Out of Here! also incorporates Takeshi's Castle like physical challenges. Stuart Heritage of The Guardian argues that the Tough Mudder endurance events may have also been inspired by Takeshi's Castle.

British GQ compared the "silly sets and close awkwardness" of Floor Is Lava (2020) to "the belly-laugh slapstick of Japanese game shows" such as Takeshi's Castle. The 2021 game show Frogger, based on Konami's 1981 arcade game of the same name, has also drawn comparisons to Takeshi's Castle.

In a 2021 LADbible poll, Takeshi's Castle was voted the classic UK TV game show that audiences miss the most.

Other media
A Nintendo Famicom (NES) game with the same name was released in 1987 by Bandai. It required the use of the Family Trainer (Power Pad) to play its eight challenges. It was played on the twelfth episode of GameCenter CX. A sequel called Fūun! Takeshi Jō Two was released in 1988 with different challenges.

The casting of Takeshi Kitano in the 2000 Japanese film Battle Royale was a reference to his earlier role as the host of Takeshi's Castle, to add a sense of potential realism to the film's extreme battle royale game show concept.

Video game developer Mediatonic cited Takeshi's Castle as an inspiration behind the popular battle royale game Fall Guys (2020).

Future

Reboot 
A reboot of the show will premiere worldwide on Amazon Prime Video in 2023.

References

External links

 Keshi Heads
 

 
1980s Japanese television series
1990s Japanese television series
1986 Japanese television series debuts
1990 Japanese television series endings
Obstacle racing television game shows
TBS Television (Japan) original programming